Ibrayevo (İbray) is a rural locality (a village) in Makarovsky Selsoviet, Ishimbaysky District, Bashkortostan, Russia. The population was 134 as of 2010. There are 2 streets.

Geography 
Ibrayevo is located 51 km northeast of Ishimbay (the district's administrative centre) by road. Isyakayevo is the nearest rural locality.

References 

Rural localities in Ishimbaysky District